The 2016 Renault Sport Series was the 12th season of Renault Sport's series of events, with two different championships racing under one banner. Consisting of the Eurocup Formula Renault 2.0 and Renault Sport Trophy, the Renault Sport Series ran at seven different venues where fans could get into the meetings for no cost whatsoever, such is the uniqueness of the series. It was the first season under the moniker Renault Sport Series.

The series began on 15 April at the Ciudad del Motor de Aragón in Alcañiz, and finished on 23 October at the Autódromo Fernanda Pires da Silva, just outside Estoril. Rounds at Bugatti Circuit, Hungaroring, Circuito de Jerez, Nürburgring and Silverstone Circuit were dropped.

Race calendar
 Event in light blue is not part of the Renault Sport Series, but is a championship round for the championship.

Championships

Eurocup Formula Renault 2.0

Renault Sport Trophy

Endurance

Pro

Am

References

 Linked articles contain additional references.

External links
 Official website of the Renault Sport

Renault Sport Series seasons